The Sumathi U.W. Sumathipala Memorial Award is presented annually by the Sumathi Group of Companies associated with many commercial brands for the artists who devoted their life to the improvement of Sri Lankan cinema, theatre and television. The award named in honour of U. W. Sumathipala, the father of current Sumathi Group owner and the founder of Sumathi Awards, Thilanga Sumathipala.

The award was first given in 1996, and in some years the award has been given to more than one person individual. The following is a list of the winners of this award.

Award winners

References

Awards established in 1996
1996 establishments in Sri Lanka
Sri Lankan awards